Paloma Márquez (born April 12, 1986) is a Mexican actress.

Filmography

Films

Television

References

External links 
 

Living people
Mexican film actresses
Mexican telenovela actresses
1986 births